The winged sun (sometimes known as Behedeti, a name of Horus) is a symbol in ancient Egyptian religion associated with divinity, royalty, and power in ancient Egypt. the symbol is attested from the Old Kingdom (Sneferu, 26th century BC ) The winged sun is symbolic also of the eternal soul. When placed above the temple doors it served as a reminder to the people of their eternal nature. The Winged Sun was linked to the falcon god Horus, however, it was also associated with the sun god Ra, with the wings of Horus, and the omnipotence of Ra.

See also 

 Winged sun
 Eye of Horus

References 

Ancient Egyptian culture
Ancient Egyptian society
Ancient Egyptian symbols